The Liberal Corporate Association of Salzburg was a political party in Austria.

History
The only election contested by the party was the 1919 Constitutional Assembly elections, in which it received 0.3% of the national vote and won a single seat.

References

Defunct political parties in Austria
Defunct liberal political parties in Austria
German nationalism in Austria
German nationalist political parties
National liberal parties
Nationalist parties in Austria